Horine is an unincorporated community and census-designated place (CDP) in Jefferson County, Missouri, United States. The population was 821 at the 2010 census, down from 923 in 2000.

History
Horine was platted in 1868, and named after C. Thomas Horine, an early settler. A post office called "Horine Station" was established in 1862, the name was changed to "Horine" in 1916, and the post office closed in 1942.

Geography
Horine is located in eastern Jefferson County at  (38.266140, -90.430290). It is bordered to the northeast by the city of Pevely, to the northwest by Route Z, and to the south by Joachim Creek, a direct tributary of the Mississippi River.

The CDP area has decreased slightly since 2000, due to some annexation by the city of Pevely.

Demographics

As of the census of 2000, there were 923 people, 335 households, and 254 families residing in the CDP. The racial makeup of the CDP was 97.83% White, 0.87% African American, 0.22% Native American, 0.11% Asian, and 0.98% from two or more races. Hispanic or Latino of any race were 0.76% of the population.

There were 335 households, out of which 34.3% had children under the age of 18 living with them, 61.8% were married couples living together, 9.3% had a female householder with no husband present, and 23.9% were non-families. 19.7% of all households were made up of individuals, and 6.0% had someone living alone who was 65 years of age or older. The average household size was 2.76 and the average family size was 3.15.

In the CDP, the population was spread out, with 24.3% under the age of 18, 10.0% from 18 to 24, 31.9% from 25 to 44, 24.8% from 45 to 64, and 9.1% who were 65 years of age or older. The median age was 36 years. For every 100 females, there were 108.8 males. For every 100 females age 18 and over, there were 113.1 males.

The median income for a household in the CDP was $41,676, and the median income for a family was $41,593. Males had a median income of $37,009 versus $20,417 for females. The per capita income for the CDP was $17,366. About 3.4% of families and 3.7% of the population were below the poverty line, including none of those under the age of eighteen or sixty-five or over.

Education
Dunklin R-V School District serves Horine.

References

Census-designated places in Jefferson County, Missouri
Census-designated places in Missouri